The following is a partial list of the "G" codes for Medical Subject Headings (MeSH), as defined by the United States National Library of Medicine (NLM).

This list continues the information at List of MeSH codes (G02). Codes following these are found at List of MeSH codes (G04). For other MeSH codes, see List of MeSH codes.

The source for this content is the set of 2006 MeSH Trees from the NLM.

– environment and public health

– environment

– altitude

– cities

– confined spaces

– conservation of natural resources
  – conservation of energy resources

– disasters
  – disaster planning
  – explosions
  – fires
  – fire extinguishing systems
  – spontaneous combustion
  – natural disasters
  – volcanic eruption
  – relief work
  – rescue work

– ecosystem
  – biodiversity
  – biomass
  – ecological systems, closed
  – food chain

– energy-generating resources
  – fossil fuels
  – coal
  – coke
  – petroleum
  – fuel oils
  – gasoline
  – kerosene
  – nuclear energy
  – nuclear fission
  – nuclear fusion
  – solar energy

– environment, controlled
  – air conditioning
  – diving
  – ecological systems, closed
  – heating
  – housing
  – housing, animal
  – hospitals, animal
  – housing for the elderly
  – public housing
  – humidity
  – life support systems
  – lighting
  – space simulation
  – weightlessness simulation
  – hindlimb suspension
  – temperature
  – ventilation

– environment design

– extraterrestrial environment
  – cosmic dust

– greenhouse effect

– meteorological factors
  – atmosphere
  – air
  – air ionization
  – air movements
  – wind
  – atmospheric pressure
  – air pressure
  – vacuum
  – climate
  – cold climate
  – desert climate
  – greenhouse effect
  – microclimate
  – tropical climate
  – cosmic radiation
  – weather
  – humidity
  – lightning
  – rain
  – acid rain
  – snow
  – sunlight
  – infrared rays
  – ultraviolet rays
  – temperature
  – cold
  – heat
  – wind

– noise

– odors

– seasons

– soil

– water
  – fresh water
  – rivers
  – hot springs
  – ice
  – ice cover
  – rain
  – acid rain
  – seawater
  – snow
  – steam
  – water movements

– public health

– accidents
  – accident prevention
  – safety
  – safety management
  – accidental falls
  – accidents, aviation
  – accidents, home
  – accidents, occupational
  – accidents, radiation
  – accidents, radiation
  – accidents, traffic
  – drowning
  – near drowning

– carrier state

– consumer product safety
  – device approval

– disease outbreaks

– disease reservoirs
  – fomites

– disease transmission
  – disease transmission, horizontal
  – basic reproduction number
  – disease transmission, patient-to-professional
  – disease transmission, professional-to-patient
  – disease transmission, vertical
  – disease vectors
  – arthropod vectors
  – arachnid vectors
  – insect vectors

– drug contamination

– endemic diseases

– environmental medicine

– environmental microbiology
  – air microbiology
  – food microbiology
  – soil microbiology
  – water microbiology

– environmental pollution
  – air pollution
  – air pollution, indoor
  – air pollution, radioactive
  – dust
  – cosmic dust
  – smog
  – smoke
  – tobacco smoke pollution
  – vehicle emissions
  – body burden
  – drug residues
  – pesticide residues
  – environmental exposure
  – environmental monitoring
  – inhalation exposure
  – maternal exposure
  – maximum allowable concentration
  – occupational exposure
  – maximum allowable concentration
  – threshold limit values
  – paternal exposure
  – food contamination
  – food contamination, radioactive
  – food microbiology
  – food parasitology
  – noise
  – noise, occupational
  – noise, transportation
  – waste products
  – hazardous waste
  – radioactive waste
  – industrial waste
  – medical waste
  – dental waste
  – medical waste disposal
  – sewage
  – water pollution
  – water pollution, chemical
  – acid rain
  – water pollution, radioactive

– epidemiologic factors
  – age factors
  – age of onset
  – maternal age
  – bias (epidemiology)
  – observer variation
  – selection bias
  – causality
  – precipitating factors
  – risk factors
  – comorbidity
  – confounding factors (epidemiology)
  – effect modifiers (epidemiology)
  – cohort effect
  – healthy worker effect
  – placebo effect
  – observer variation
  – reproductive history
  – gravidity
  – parity
  – sex factors

– epidemiologic measurements
  – biometry
  – anthropometry
  – body mass index
  – cephalometry
  – crown-rump length
  – demography
  – age distribution
  – censuses
  – family characteristics
  – birth order
  – health status
  – geriatric assessment
  – population density
  – population dynamics
  – emigration and immigration
  – health transition
  – population control
  – population growth
  – residence characteristics
  – catchment area (health)
  – housing
  – residential mobility
  – sex distribution
  – sex ratio
  – vital statistics
  – life expectancy
  – life tables
  – morbidity
  – basic reproduction number
  – incidence
  – prevalence
  – mortality
  – cause of death
  – child mortality
  – fatal outcome
  – fetal mortality
  – hospital mortality
  – infant mortality
  – maternal mortality
  – survival rate
  – pregnancy rate
  – birth rate
  – risk assessment

– epidemiologic methods
  – contact tracing
  – data collection
  – geriatric assessment
  – health surveys
  – behavioral risk factor surveillance system
  – dental health surveys
  – dental plaque index
  – dmf index
  – oral hygiene index
  – periodontal index
  – health status indicators
  – sickness impact profile
  – mass screening
  – anonymous testing
  – genetic screening
  – mass chest x-ray
  – multiphasic screening
  – neonatal screening
  – vision screening
  – nutrition surveys
  – diet surveys
  – population surveillance
  – sentinel surveillance
  – health care surveys
  – interviews
  – focus groups
  – narration
  – nutrition assessment
  – nutrition surveys
  – diet surveys
  – questionnaires
  – records
  – birth certificates
  – death certificates
  – dental records
  – hospital records
  – medical records
  – medical record linkage
  – medical records systems, computerized
  – medical records, problem-oriented
  – trauma severity indices
  – nursing records
  – registries
  – seer program
  – vital statistics
  – life expectancy
  – life tables
  – morbidity
  – basic reproduction number
  – incidence
  – prevalence
  – mortality
  – cause of death
  – child mortality
  – fatal outcome
  – fetal mortality
  – hospital mortality
  – infant mortality
  – maternal mortality
  – survival rate
  – pregnancy rate
  – birth rate
  – disease notification
  – epidemiology, molecular
  – epidemiologic research design
  – cross-over studies
  – double-blind method
  – matched-pair analysis
  – meta-analysis
  – random allocation
  – reproducibility of results
  – sample size
  – sensitivity and specificity
  – predictive value of tests
  – roc curve
  – single-blind method
  – epidemiologic study characteristics
  – epidemiologic studies
  – case-control studies
  – retrospective studies
  – cohort studies
  – follow-up studies
  – longitudinal studies
  – prospective studies
  – cross-sectional studies
  – seroepidemiologic studies
  – hiv seroprevalence
  – clinical trials
  – clinical trials, phase i
  – clinical trials, phase ii
  – clinical trials, phase iii
  – clinical trials, phase iv
  – controlled clinical trials
  – randomized controlled trials
  – multicenter studies
  – feasibility studies
  – intervention studies
  – pilot projects
  – sampling studies
  – twin studies
  – sentinel surveillance
  – statistics
  – actuarial analysis
  – analysis of variance
  – multivariate analysis
  – area under curve
  – cluster analysis
  – small-area analysis
  – space-time clustering
  – confidence intervals
  – data interpretation, statistical
  – discriminant analysis
  – factor analysis, statistical
  – matched-pair analysis
  – models, statistical
  – likelihood functions
  – linear models
  – logistic models
  – models, economic
  – models, econometric
  – nomograms
  – proportional hazards models
  – monte carlo method
  – probability
  – bayes theorem
  – likelihood functions
  – markov chains
  – odds ratio
  – proportional hazards models
  – risk
  – logistic models
  – risk assessment
  – risk factors
  – uncertainty
  – regression analysis
  – least-squares analysis
  – linear models
  – logistic models
  – proportional hazards models
  – sensitivity and specificity
  – statistical distributions
  – binomial distribution
  – chi-square distribution
  – normal distribution
  – poisson distribution
  – statistics, nonparametric
  – stochastic processes
  – markov chains
  – survival analysis
  – disease-free survival

– equipment contamination

– equipment reuse

– health education

– health transition

– hygiene
  – military hygiene

– public health practice
  – communicable disease control
  – contact tracing
  – disease notification
  – fumigation
  – handwashing
  – immunization
  – mass immunization
  – vaccination
  – infection control
  – antisepsis
  – asepsis
  – infection control, dental
  – patient isolation
  – quarantine
  – sterilization
  – disinfection
  – mandatory testing
  – pest control
  – insect control
  – mosquito control
  – pest control, biological
  – rodent control
  – tick control
  – sanitation
  – food inspection
  – sanitary engineering
  – drainage, sanitary
  – refuse disposal
  – waste disposal, fluid
  – waste management
  – water purification
  – universal precautions
  – decontamination
  – environmental monitoring
  – radiation monitoring
  – mass screening
  – anonymous testing
  – genetic screening
  – mandatory testing
  – mass chest x-ray
  – multiphasic screening
  – neonatal screening
  – substance abuse detection
  – vision screening
  – population surveillance
  – sentinel surveillance
  – primary prevention
  – immunization
  – mass immunization
  – vaccination

– radiologic health
  – air pollution, radioactive
  – food contamination, radioactive
  – radiation dosage
  – dose-response relationship, radiation
  – relative biological effectiveness
  – radiation effects
  – radiation injuries
  – abnormalities, radiation-induced
  – radiation injuries, experimental
  – radiation genetics
  – radiation monitoring
  – film dosimetry
  – thermoluminescent dosimetry
  – radiation protection
  – radioactive fallout
  – radioactive waste
  – water pollution, radioactive

– sanitation
  – public facilities
  – bathing beaches
  – health resorts
  – swimming pools
  – toilet facilities
  – sanitary engineering
  – biodegradation
  – toilet facilities
  – waste management
  – refuse disposal
  – garbage
  – incineration
  – medical waste disposal
  – waste disposal, fluid
  – sewage
  – waste disposal, fluid
  – water purification
  – water softening
  – water supply
  – fluoridation
  – water purification

– public health dentistry

– dental health surveys
  – dental plaque index
  – dmf index
  – oral hygiene index
  – periodontal index

– fluoridation

– health education, dental

The list continues at List of MeSH codes (G04).

G03